The  are the "twenty instructions" of the Okinawan martial arts master Gichin Funakoshi, whose pen name was Shōtō. All students of Shōtōkan karate are encouraged to live, practice, and teach the principles to others.

History 

Funakoshi trained in Shuri-te and Naha-te from an early age. He ultimately developed his style of karate, which he believed leveraged the benefits of these two.

Precepts 

 Karate-do begins and ends with bowing. 

 There is no first strike in karate.  

 Karate stands on the side of justice. 

 First know yourself, then know others.  

 Mentality over technique. 

 The heart must be set free.  

 Calamity springs from carelessness. 

 Karate goes beyond the dojo. 

 Karate is a lifelong pursuit.  

 Apply the way of karate to all things. Therein lies its beauty. 

 Karate is like boiling water; without heat, it returns to its tepid state. 

 Do not think of winning. Think, rather, of not losing. 

 Make adjustments according to your opponent.  

 The outcome of a battle depends on how one handles emptiness and fullness (weakness and strength).  

 Think of hands and feet as swords.  

  When you step beyond your own gate, you face a million enemies. 

  Formal stances are for beginners; later, one stands naturally. 

  Perform prescribed sets of techniques exactly; actual combat is another matter. 

  Do not forget the employment of withdrawal of power, the extension or contraction of the body, the swift or leisurely application of technique. 

  Be constantly mindful, diligent, and resourceful, in your pursuit of the Way. 

The precepts are not numbered or ordered; each begins with  meaning "one" or "first" to show that each rule has the same level of importance as the others.

References 

Japanese martial arts terminology
Shotokan
Wisdom literature